Fábio Vieira may refer to:
Fábio Vieira (footballer, born 1991), Portuguese footballer
Fábio Vieira (footballer, born 2000), Portuguese footballer